Vladimir Ilyich Kolesnikov (in , born 14 May 1948) is a Russian lawyer and politician.

Kolesnikov was born in Gudauta, Abkhaz ASSR, Soviet Union. In 1995–2000 he was a First Deputy Interior Minister of Russia. He served as the acting Minister in September 1996, when Minister Anatoly Kulikov was on vacation. From 23 April 2002, until 7 July 2006, he was a Deputy Prosecutor General of Russia under Vladimir Ustinov. Since 19 July 2006, he has been a Deputy Justice Minister of Russia.

External links
Biography

1948 births
Living people
Russian lawyers
Fifth convocation members of the State Duma (Russian Federation)